Vilana is a white Greek wine grape variety planted primarily in Crete. The grape is a difficult one to cultivate and produces delicate wines rarely seen outside Greece.

Synonyms
Vilana is also known under the synonyms Belana and Velana.

References

White wine grape varieties
Grape varieties of Greece